This list of the Paleozoic life of Idaho contains the various prehistoric life-forms whose fossilized remains have been reported from within the US state of Idaho and are between 541 and 252.17 million years of age.

A

 †Acrothele
 †Acrothele affinis
 †Acrothele artemis
 †Acrothele parilis – type locality for species
 †Acrothele speciosa – type locality for species
 †Acrothyra
 †Acrothyra minor
 †Acrotreta
 †Acrotreta definita
 †Acrotreta eucharis – type locality for species
 †Acrotreta levata
 †Acrotreta nitens – type locality for species
 †Acrotreta sulcata
 †Adrianites
   †Agnostus
 †Agnostus bonnerensis – type locality for species
 †Agnostus lautus – type locality for species
 †Albertella
 †Albertella sampsoni – type locality for species
 †Allanaria
 †Allanaria engelmanni
 †Alokistocare
 †Alokistocare euchare – type locality for species
 †Alokistocare idahoense
 †Alokistocare laticaudum
 †Alokistocare nactum – type locality for species
 †Alokistocare natale – type locality for species
 †Alokistocare noduliferum – type locality for species
 †Alokistocare normale – type locality for species
 †Alokistocare notatum – type locality for species
 †Alokistocare nothum – type locality for species
 †Alokistocare septum
 †Alokistocare spencense
 †Alokistocarella
 †Alokistocarella occidens – type locality for species
 †Alokistocarella spencei
 †Amblycranium
 †Amblycranium cornutum – type locality for species
 †Amblycranium populus – type locality for species
 †Amblycranium variabile – type locality for species
 †Ambothyris
 †Ambothyris utahensis – type locality for species
 †Amechilus
 †Amechilus palaora – type locality for species
 †Amphipora
 †Amplexizaphrenitis
 †Amplexizaphrentis
 †Amplexograptus
 †Amplexograptus latus – or unidentified related form
 †Amplexograptus manitoulinensis – or unidentified related form
 †Amplexograptus perexcavatus
 †Amplexus
 †Ampyxina
 † Ananias
 †Ananias nevadensis – or unidentified related form
 †Anazyga
 †Anazyga recurvirostra – or unidentified comparable form
 †Ancenochilus
 †Anidanthus
 †Anidanthus echaris
 †Anidanthus eucharis – type locality for species
 †Anomalorthis
 †Anthracospirifer
 †Anthracospirifer arcoensis – type locality for species
 †Anthracospirifer curvilateralis
 †Anthracospirifer leidyi
 †Anthracospirifer occiduus
 †Anthracospirifer shawi
 †Antiquatonia
 †Antiquatonia sulcatus – or unidentified comparable form
 †Apatokephalus – tentative report
 †Apheorthis
 †Apheorthis meeki – or unidentified comparable form
 †Appendispinograptus
 †Appendispinograptus longispinus
 †Apterrinella
 †Arachniograptus
 †Arachniograptus laqueus
 †Archaeocyathus
 Archaeolithophyllum
 †Asaphellus – tentative report
 †Asaphellus eudocia
 †Astartella
 †Astartella subquadrata
 †Asthenospongia – type locality for genus
 †Asthenospongia acantha – type locality for species
  †Atrypa
 †Atrypa oneidensis – type locality for species
 †Atrypa putilla – or unidentified related form
  †Aulopora
 †Auloprotonia
 †Austinella
 †Austinella whitfieldi – or unidentified related form
  †Aviculopecten
 †Aviculopecten kaibabensis – or unidentified comparable form
 † Avonia

B

 †Babylonites
 †Babylonites conoideus
 †Babylonites ferrieri – type locality for species
 †Bakevellia – tentative report
 †Basilicus – tentative report
 †Bathymyonia
 †Bathymyonia nevadensis – type locality for species
 †Bathyuriscus
 †Bathyuriscus atossa
 †Bathyuriscus politus – type locality for species
 †Bearriverops
 †Bearriverops alsacharovi
 †Bearriverops borderinnensis
 †Bearriverops loganensis – type locality for species
 †Bellaspis – tentative report
 †Bellefontia
 †Bellefontia acuminiferentis
 †Bellefontia chamberlaini
 †Bensbergia
 †Bensbergia altivolvis
 †Benthamaspis
 †Benthamaspis obrepta
 †Billingsella
 †Blastoidocrinus
 †Blastoidocrinus carchariaedens – or unidentified comparable form
 †Brachythyris
 †Brachythyris subcardiiformis
 †Bythicheilus
 †Bythicheilus alveatum
 †Bythicheilus typicum

C

 †Camarotechia
 †Cancrinella
 †Cancrinella phosphatica – type locality for species
 †Caninia
 †Caninia excentrica
 †Cardiograptus
 †Cardiomorpha – tentative report
 †Chaetetes
 †Chancia
 †Chancia angusta
 †Chancia ebdome
 †Chancia evax
 †Chonetes
 †Chonetes logani
 †Clappaspis
 †Clappaspis coriacea
 †Clappaspis dotis
 †Clappaspis idahoensis
 †Clappaspis lanata
 †Clappaspis spencei
 †Clavaspidella
 †Clavaspidella bithus
 †Clavaspidella minor – type locality for species
 †Cleiothryidina
  †Cleiothyridina
 †Cleiothyridina miettensis
 †Cleiothyridina obmaxima
 †Cleiothyridina sublamellosa
 †Cleiothyridina tenuilineata
 †Cleiothyridinia
 †Clelandia
 †Clelandia utahensis – type locality for species
  †Climacograptus
 †Climacograptus bicornis
 †Climacograptus brevis
 †Climacograptus caudatus
 †Climacograptus hastatus
 †Climacograptus innotatus
 †Climacograptus minimus – or unidentified comparable form
 †Climacograptus mohawkensis – or unidentified comparable form
 †Climacograptus raricaudatus – or unidentified comparable form
 †Climacograptus riddellensis
 †Climacograptus scalaris – or unidentified comparable form
 †Climacograptus tabuliferus – or unidentified comparable form
 †Climacograptus tubuliferus
 †Climacograptus uncinatus
 †Clinopistha
  †Composita
 †Composita humilis
 †Composita humulis
 †Composita idahoensis – type locality for species
 †Composita mira – or unidentified comparable form
 †Composita sigma
 †Composita subquadrata
 †Composita subtilita – or unidentified comparable form
 †Composita sulcata
 †Corynoides
 †Corynoides calicularis
 †Croixana
 †Crurithyris
 †Crurithyris arcuata – type locality for species
 †Crurithyris arcuatus
 †Cryptograptus
 †Cryptograptus tricornis
 †Cyathaxonia
 †Cyclogyra – tentative report
 †Cyrtina
 †Cyrtina acutirostris
 †Cyrtina billingsi – or unidentified comparable form
 †Cyrtograptus
 †Cyrtograptus grayae – or unidentified comparable form
 †Cyrtograptus kirki
 †Cyrtograptus laqueus
 †Cyrtograptus rigidus
 †Cyrtorostra
 †Cyrtorostra varicostata
 †Cystidictya
 †Cystodictya
 †Cythaxonia

D

 †Daubichites
 †Daubichites brevicostatus – type locality for species
 †Demarezites
 †Demarezites furnishi – type locality for species
 †Derbyia
 †Diaphragmus
 †Diaphragmus nivosus
 †Dibunophyllum
 †Dicellograptus
 †Dicellograptus alector – type locality for species
 †Dicellograptus angulatus – or unidentified comparable form
 †Dicellograptus divaricatus
 †Dicellograptus elegans – or unidentified comparable form
 †Dicellograptus ornatus
 †Dicellograptus sextans
 †Diceromyonia
 †Diceromyonia tersa – or unidentified comparable form
 †Diconularia
 †Diconularia meadepeakensis – type locality for species
 †Dicranograptus
 †Dicranograptus brevicaulis – or unidentified comparable form
 †Dicranograptus contortus
 †Dicranograptus kirki – or unidentified comparable form
 †Dicranograptus nicholsoni
 †Dicranograptus spinifer
 †Dictyoclostus
 †Dictyoclustus – report made of unidentified related form or using admittedly obsolete nomenclature
 †Dictyonema
  †Didymograptus
 †Didymograptus extensus
 †Didymograptus gemminus – or unidentified comparable form
 †Didymograptus gracilis
 †Didymograptus protobifidus
 †Dielasma
 †Dimegelasma
 †Diparelasma
 †Diparelasma typicum – or unidentified comparable form
 †Diphyphyllum
  †Diplograptus
 †Dolichometopsis
 †Dolichometopsis alia – type locality for species
 †Dolichometopsis comis – type locality for species
 †Dolichometopsis communis – type locality for species
 †Dolichometopsis gravis – type locality for species
 †Dolichometopsis lepida – type locality for species
 †Dolichometopsis media – type locality for species
 †Dolichometopsis potens – type locality for species
 †Dolichometopsis poulseni – type locality for species
 †Dolichometopsis propinqua – type locality for species
 †Dolichometopsis stella – type locality for species
 †Dorispira
 †Dorispira arguta – type locality for species
 †Dorispira burlingi – type locality for species
 †Dorispira pocatelloensis – type locality for species
 †Dorlodotia
 †Dyscritella
 †Dyscritella bogatensis
 †Dyscritellina
 †Dyscritellina grandicora – type locality for species
 †Dyscritellina multispinosa

E

 †Echinauris
 †Echinoconchus
 †Echinoconchus alternatus
 †Edmondia
 †Edmondia phosphatica – type locality for species
 †Edmondia phosphoriensis – or unidentified comparable form
 †Ehmaniella
 †Ehmaniella maladensis
 †Ekvasophyllum
  †Elrathia
 †Elrathia idahoensis – type locality for species
 †Elrathia longiceps – type locality for species
 †Elrathia offula
 †Elrathia rara
 †Elrathia sampsoni – type locality for species
 †Elrathia spencei
 †Elrathina
 †Elrathina spencei – or unidentified comparable form
 †Emanuella
 †Endothyra
 †Eochonetes
 †Eochonetes voldemortus – type locality for species
 †Eocrinus
 †Eocrinus longidactylus
 †Eolissochonetes
 †Eolissochonetes pseudoliratus
 †Eomartiniopsis
 †Eomartiniopsis rostrata
 †Eugonophyllum
 †Eumetria
 †Eumetria costata
  †Euomphalus
 †Euomphalus subplanus

F

 †Faberophyllum
 †Faberophylum
 †Faberphyllum
 †Fenestella
 †Fistulipora
 †Flectihystricurus
 †Flectihystricurus acumennasus – type locality for species
 †Flectihystricurus flectimembrus – type locality for species
 †Flexaria

G

 †Gastrioceras – report made of unidentified related form or using admittedly obsolete nomenclature
 †Gastrioceras williamsi
 †Genalaticurus
 †Genalaticurus genalatus – type locality for species
 †Girtyella
 †Girtypecten
 †Girvanella
 †Glabrocingulum – tentative report
 †Glassoceras
 †Glassoceras bransonorum – type locality for species
 †Globivalvulina
 †Glossograptus
 †Glossograptus hincksii
 †Glossopleura
 †Glossopleura bion
 †Glossopleura intermedia – type locality for species
 †Glossopleura similaris
 †Glyptograptus
 †Glyptograptus altus
 †Glyptograptus euglyphus
 †Glyptograptus tamariscus
 †Glyptorthis
 †Glyptorthis pulchra – or unidentified comparable form
   †Gogia
 †Gogia hobbsi
 †Gogia palmeri
 †Goniograptus
 †Goniograptus geometricus
 †Goniophrys
 †Goniophrys prima – type locality for species
 †Gosseletina
 †Gosseletina idahoensis

H

 †Hallograptus
   †Haplophrentis
 †Haplophrentis carinatus – type locality for species
 †Hedraites
 †Helcionella
  †Helicoprion
 †Helicoprion davisii – type locality for species
 †Helicoprion ergassaminon – type locality for species
 †Hesperonomia
 †Hesperonomia dinorthoides
 †Hillyardina
 †Hillyardina marginauctum – type locality for species
 †Hillyardina semicylindrica – type locality for species
 †Hintzecurus
 †Hintzecurus paragenalatus – type locality for species
 †Hintzeia
 †Hintzeia celsaora – type locality for species
 †Homalophyllites
 †Homalophyllites subcrassus
 †Hustedia
 †Hustedograptus
 †Hustedograptus teretiusculus
  †Hyolithes
 †Hyolithes ornatellus
 †Hyolithes prolixus – type locality for species
 †Hypothetica
 †Hypothetica rawi – type locality for species
 †Hystricurus
 †Hystricurus contractus – type locality for species
 †Hystricurus oculilunatus – type locality for species
 †Hystricurus robustus – type locality for species

I

 †Idahoia
 †Inflatia
 †Inflatia inflata – or unidentified comparable form
 †Inglefieldia
 †Iphidella
 †Iphidella grata
 †Iphidella maladensis
 †Iphidella pannula – or unidentified comparable form
 †Isograptus
 †Isograptus victoriae

J

 †Juresania

K

 †Kaskia
 †Kazakhstania
 †Kochaspis
 †Kochaspis maladensis – type locality for species
 †Kochiella
 †Kochina
 †Kochina venusta – type locality for species
 †Kochina vestita – type locality for species
 †Kochina wasatchensis – type locality for species
 †Kochiproductus
 †Kochiproductus longus – or unidentified comparable form
 †Komiella
 †Komiella ostiolata – type locality for species
   †Kootenia
 †Kootenia acicularis – type locality for species
 †Kootenia brevispina – type locality for species
 †Kootenia convoluta – type locality for species
 †Kootenia granulosa – type locality for species
 †Kootenia idahoensis
 †Kootenia maladensis – type locality for species
 †Kootenia nitida – type locality for species
 †Kootenia spencei
 †Kozlowskia

L

 †Lasiograptus
 †Lasiograptus harknessi
 †Leiorhynchoidea
 †Leiorhynchoidea carbonifera
 †Leiorhynchus
 †Leiorhynchus carboniferum
 †Leiorhynchus weeksi
 †Leiostegium
 †Leiostegium manitouense
 †Leptagonia
 †Leptagonia analoga
 †Leptagonia missouriensis
 †Leptograptus
 †Leptograptus demissus – type locality for species
 †Leptograptus flaccidus
 †Licnocephala
 †Licnocephala bicornuta – type locality for species
 †Licnocephala cavigladius
 †Licnocephala ovata – type locality for species
  †Lingula
 †Lingula carbonaria
  †Lingulella
 †Lingulella eucharis – type locality for species
 †Lingulella idahoensis – type locality for species
 †Linoproductus
 †Liosotella – or unidentified related form
 †Lithostrontionella
 †Lithostrotion
 †Lithostrotionella
 †Lithostrotionella pennsylvanicum
 †Lithostrotionella stelcki
 †Lithstrotionella
 †Lithstrotionella pennsylvanicum
 †Loganiella – type locality for genus
 †Loganiella johnsoni – type locality for species
 †Loganograptus
 †Loganograptus logani
 †Lordorthis – type locality for genus
 †Lordorthis variabilis – type locality for species

M

 †Macropotamorhyncus
 †Macropotamorhyncus insolitus
 †Macropyge
 †Macropyge gladiator – type locality for species
 †Maeandrograptus
 †Maeandrograptus tau
  †Margaretia
 †Margaretia angustata – type locality for species
 †Martinia
 †Menoparia
 †Menoparia genalunata – type locality for species
 †Menoparia lunalata – type locality for species
 †Metabowmania
 †Metabowmania latilimbata – or unidentified comparable form
 †Metriophyllum
 †Metriophyllum deminutivum
 †Michelinia
 †Micromitra
 †Micromitra haydeni
 †Micromitra lepida
 †Minkella
 †Monoclimacis
 †Monoclimacis griestoniensis – or unidentified related form
  †Monograptus
 †Monograptus argutus – or unidentified comparable form
 †Monograptus convolutus
 †Monograptus decipiens – or unidentified comparable form
 †Monograptus flemingii – or unidentified comparable form
 †Monograptus leptotheca – or unidentified comparable form
 †Monograptus lobiferus
 †Monograptus sedgwickii
 †Mooreoceras – tentative report
 †Morania
 †Morozoviella
 †Morozoviella praecurriensis

N

 †Nanorthis – tentative report
  †Naticopsis
 †Naticopsis tayloriana – type locality for species
 †Nemagraptus
 †Nemagraptus gracilis – or unidentified comparable form
 †Neoeridotrypella
 †Neoeridotrypella pulchra
  †Neospirifer
 †Neurograptus
 †Neurograptus margaritatus
 †Niobe – tentative report
 †Nuculopsis
 †Nuculopsis montpelierensis – type locality for species

O

 †Obolus
 †Oelandiella
 †Oelandiella aequa – type locality for species
   †Ogygopsis
 †Ogygopsis magna – type locality for species
 †Ogygopsis typicalis
  †Olenoides
 †Olenoides maladensis
 †Orbiculoidea
 †Orbiculoidea missouriensis
 †Orbiculoidea wyomingensis
 †Orbinaria
 †Orthograptus
 †Orthograptus calcaratus
 †Orthograptus pageanus
 †Orthograptus quadrimucronatus
 †Orthograptus truncatus
 †Orthograptus whitfieldi
 †Orthoretiolites
 †Orthoretiolites hami
 †Orthotetes
 †Orthotetes kaskaskiensis
 †Orthotheca
 †Orthotheca sola
 †Oryctocara – type locality for genus
 †Oryctocara geikei
 †Oryctocara geikiei – type locality for species
 †Oryctocare
 †Oryctocephalites
 †Oryctocephalites typicalis – type locality for species
 †Oryctocephalus
 †Oryctocephalus maladensis – type locality for species
 †Oryctocephalus walcotti – type locality for species
 †Ovatia
 †Overtonia

P

 †Pachyaspis
 †Pachyaspis typicalis – type locality for species
 †Pachycranium
 †Pachycranium faciclunis – type locality for species
 †Paenebeltella
 †Paenebeltella vultulata – type locality for species
  †Pagetia
 †Pagetia clytia
 †Pagetia fossula – type locality for species
 †Pagetia maladensis – type locality for species
 †Pagetia rugosa
 †Palaeacis
 †Palaeacis cuneiformis
 Palaeoaplysina
 †Palaeocoryne
 †Palaeoneilo
 †Palaeoneilo mcchesneyana – type locality for species
 †Paleocoryne
 †Parahystricurus
 †Parahystricurus carinatus – type locality for species
 †Parahystricurus fraudator – type locality for species
 †Parahystricurus oculirotundus – type locality for species
 †Parahystricurus pustulosus – type locality for species
 †Paraorthograptus
 †Paraorthograptus pacificus
 †Parisograptus
 †Parisograptus caduceus
 †Paterina
 †Paterina hirta – type locality for species
  †Pelagiella
 †Peltabellia
 †Peltabellia peltabella – type locality for species
 †Peneckiella
 †Penniretepora
 †Pericyclus
 †Pericyclus decipiens – type locality for species
 †Permastraea
 †Permastraea solida
  †Peronopsis
 †Peronopsis bonnerensis
 †Perrinites
 †Perrinites hilli
 †Petalograptus
 †Petalograptus minor
 †Petigurus – tentative report
  †Phyllograptus
 †Phyllograptus angustifolius
 †Phyllograptus anna
 †Phyllograptus ilicifolius
 †Pilekia – tentative report
  †Plaesiomys
 †Plaesiomys subquadrata
   †Platyceras
  †Platycrinites
 †Platycrinus
  †Platystrophia
 †Platystrophia equiconvexa – or unidentified comparable form
 †Pleurograptus
 †Pleurograptus linearis
 †Polidevcia
 †Polidevcia obesa
 †Poliella
 †Poliella anteros
 †Poliella caranus
 †Politicurus
 †Politicurus politus – type locality for species
 †Polypora
 †Poulsenia
 †Poulsenia granosa – type locality for species
 †Poulsenia occidens – type locality for species
 †Primaspis
 †Prodentalium
 †Prodentalium canna
  †Proetus
 †Prolecanites – tentative report
 †Prolecanites lyoni
 †Prospira
 †Prospira albapinensis – or unidentified comparable form
 †Protoconchioides
 †Protoconchioides douli – type locality for species
 †Protopliomerella
 †Protopliomerella contracta
 †Protospongia
 †Prozacanthoides
 †Prozacanthoides aequus – type locality for species
 †Prozacanthoides alatus – type locality for species
 †Prozacanthoides decorosus – type locality for species
 †Prozacanthoides exilis – type locality for species
 †Prozacanthoides optatus – type locality for species
 †Psalikilopsis
 †Psalikilopsis cuspidicauda – type locality for species
 †Psalikilus
 †Psalikilus typicum – type locality for species
 †Pseudagnostus
 †Pseudisograptus
 †Pseudisograptus dumosus
 †Pseudobatostomella
 †Pseudobatostomella decora
 †Pseudobatostomella kamiensis
 †Pseudoclelandia
 †Pseudoclelandia cornupsittaca – type locality for species
 †Pseudoclelandia fluxafissura – type locality for species
 †Pseudoclelandia lenisora – type locality for species
 †Pseudoclimacograptus
 †Pseudoclimacograptus scharenbergi
 †Pseudocystophora
 †Pseudocystophora complexa
 †Pseudodorlodotia
 †Pseudogastrioceras
 †Pseudohystricurus
 †Pseudohystricurus obesus – type locality for species
 †Pseudohystricurus orbus – type locality for species
 †Pseudohystricurus rotundus – type locality for species
 †Pseudomonotis
 †Ptarmigania
 †Ptarmigania agrestis – type locality for species
 †Ptarmigania altilis – type locality for species
 †Ptarmigania aurita – type locality for species
 †Ptarmigania dignata – type locality for species
 †Ptarmigania exigua – type locality for species
 †Ptarmigania germana – type locality for species
 †Ptarmigania natalis – type locality for species
 †Ptarmigania ornata – type locality for species
 †Ptarmigania sobrina – type locality for species
 †Ptychaspis
 †Pugnoides
 †Pugnoides quinqueplecis
 †Punctospirifer
 †Punctospirifer solidirostris
 †Punctospirifer transversus
 †Pyraustocranium
 †Pyraustocranium orbatum – type locality for species

Q

 †Quadratia
 †Quadratia hirsutiformis

R

 †Rafinesquina – tentative report
 †Rasettia – tentative report
 †Rectograptus
 †Rectograptus amplexicaulis
 †Remopleuridiella
 †Remopleuridiella caudalimbata – type locality for species
 †Reteoeraotus
 †Reteograptus
 †Reteograptus geinitzianus
 †Reteograptus pulcherrimus – or unidentified comparable form
 †Reticulariina
 †Reticulariina spinosa
 †Rhipidomella
 †Rhipidomella arkansana
 †Rhipidomella diminutiva
 †Rhipidomella missouriensis
 †Rhipidomella nevadensis
 †Rhombopora
 †Rhynchopora
 †Rhynchopora taylori – type locality for species
 †Rhyncopora
 †Rhynoleichus
 †Rhynoleichus weeksi
 †Rossaspis
 †Rossaspis superciliosa – type locality for species
 †Rossicurus
 †Rotopericyclus
 †Rotopericyclus pinyonensis – type locality for species
 †Rugosochonetes
 †Rugosochonetes loganensis – or unidentified comparable form
 †Ruzhencevia
 †Ruzhencevia incrustata
 †Rylstonia

S

 †Sanguinolites
 †Sanguinolites carbonaria – type locality for species
 †Saratogia
 †Scaphellina – tentative report
 †Schistometopus – type locality for genus
 †Schistometopus typicalis – type locality for species
 †Schizodus
 †Schizodus bifidus
 †Schizodus ferrieri – type locality for species
 †Schizograptus
 †Schizophoria
 †Schizophoria depressa
 †Schizophoria poststriatula – or unidentified comparable form
 †Schizophoria resupinata
 †Schuchertella
 †Scinocephalus
 †Scinocephalus quadrihastatus – type locality for species
 †Scinocephalus solitecti – type locality for species
  †Selkirkia
 †Selkirkia spencei
 †Septopora
 †Setigerites
 †Shamovella
  †Siphonodendron
 †Spencia
 †Spencia plena
 †Sphenosteges
  †Spirifer
 †Spirifer albertensis
 †Spirifer bifurcatus
 †Spirifer biplicoides
 †Spirifer brazerianus
 †Spirifer forbesi
 †Spirifer osagensis
 †Spirifer pellaensis
 †Spirifer rowleyi
  †Spiriferina
 †Spirolegoceras – type locality for genus
 †Spirolegoceras fischeri – type locality for species
 †Stacheoceras
 †Stacheoceras sexlobatum – type locality for species
 †Stachyodes
 †Stauroholcus
 †Stauroholcus typicalis
 †Stenoconites – type locality for genus
 †Stenoconites idahoensis – type locality for species
 †Stenolobulites
 †Stenolobulites simulator – type locality for species
 †Stenolobulites sinuosus – type locality for species
 †Stenopora
 †Stenopora grandis
 †Straparollus
 †Straparollus ophirensis
 †Stratifera
 †Stratifera brazeriana
 †Streblochondria
 †Streblopteria
 †Streblopteria montpelierensis – type locality for species
 †Striatifera
   †Strophomena
 †Subglobosochonetes
 †Subglobosochonetes norquayensis
 †Sulcoretepora
 †Symphysurina
 †Symphysurina illaenoides
 †Syntrophopsis
 †Syntrophopsis polita – or unidentified comparable form
 †Syntrophopsis transversa
  †Syringopora
 †Syringopora surcularia
 †Syringopora surcularis

T

 †Tabantaloceras
 †Tabulipora
 †Taenicephalina
 †Taenicephalus
 †Tesselacauda
 †Tesselacauda depressa – type locality for species
 †Tetracamera
  †Tetragraptus
 †Tetragraptus amii
 †Tetragraptus pseudobigsbyi
 †Tetragraptus quadribrachiatus
 †Tetralobula – tentative report
 †Tetraporinus
 †Tetrataxis
 †Thamnopora
  †Thoracocare
 †Thoracocare minuta
 †Timaniella
 †Timaniella pseudocamerata
 †Toernquistia – tentative report
 †Tonkinella
 †Tonkinella idahoensis – type locality for species
 †Torynifer
 †Torynifer cooperensis
 †Torynifer pseudolineata
 †Trigonocerca
 †Trigonocerca typica
 †Triticites
 †Tritoechia
 †Tschussovskenia
 †Tschussovskenia connorsensis

U

 †Unispirifer
 †Unispirifer minnewankensis
 †Urotheca
 †Urotheca sampsoni – type locality for species
 †Utia
 †Utia curio

V

 †Vanuxemella
 †Vanuxemella idahoensis – type locality for species
 †Vesiculophyllum
 †Vistoia – tentative report
 †Vistoia minuta
 †Vnigripecten
 †Vnigripecten phosphaticus

W

 †Werriea
 †Werriea australis
 †Wilbernia
 †Wilkingia
 †Wilkingia walkeri
 †Wilsonastraea
 †Wilsonastraea smithi
 †Wimanella
 †Wimanella maladensis – type locality for species
 †Wimanella nautes
 †Wimanella rara
 †Wimanella spencei
 †Worthenia – tentative report

X

 †Xenostegium
 †Xenostegium franklinense – type locality for species
 †Xenostegium taurus

Y

 †Yakovlevia
 †Yakovlevia geniculata – type locality for species
 †Yakovlevia multistriatus

Z

 †Zacanthoides
 †Zacanthoides abbreviatus
 †Zacanthoides adjunctus
 †Zacanthoides gradatus
 †Zacanthoides holopygous
 †Zacanthoides holopygus
 †Zacanthoides idahoensis – type locality for species
 †Zacanthoides sampsoni – type locality for species
 †Zacanthoides serratus
 †Zaphrenthis – report made of unidentified related form or using admittedly obsolete nomenclature
 †Zaphrenthis compressus
 †Zaphrentites
 †Zaphrentites spinulosus
 †Zygospira
 †Zygospira circularis – or unidentified comparable form
 †Zygospira lebanonensis – or unidentified comparable form

References
 

Paleozoic
Life
Idaho